Grasseichthys gabonensis is an extremely small (around 2 cm)  fish native to the Ivindo and Central Congo basins of Africa.  It is the only member of its genus.

References

Endemic fauna of Gabon
Kneriidae
Taxa named by Jacques Géry
Fish of Africa
Monotypic freshwater fish genera